French Flower-class corvettes were those ships of the  built for, or operated by, the French Navy and Free French Naval Forces in World War II. At the outbreak of the war, four anti-submarine warfare ships were ordered from a British shipyard, and a further 18 ships were later ordered from several British and French shipyards. Following the Fall of France in June 1940, the ships in Britain were taken over by the Royal Navy, while those in France fell into German hands. Eight other Flowers were later transferred to the Free French Naval Forces.

Construction history
At the outbreak of World War II the Marine nationale (French Navy) needed ships for anti-submarine warfare (ASW) and, following the Royal Navy's example, placed orders from Smiths Dock in South Bank, Middlesbrough, for four ASW corvettes. Smiths had developed plans for a basic ASW vessel, using merchant ship equipment and machinery, that could be mass-produced in Merchant shipyards.

Following this the Marine nationale ordered a further 18 ships, to be built at a number of British and French shipyards. These were identical to the British "Flowers" except that French  and 13.2 mm AA guns were to be fitted.

The Fall of France in June 1940 brought a drastic change to these building programmes. Of the original four, only one, La Bastiaise, was completed. On 22 June 1940, the day of France's capitulation, she was undergoing sea trials in the North Sea when she struck a mine off Hartlepool and sank. Of the others, La Malouine was taken over as she was by the Royal Navy (RN) on completion, while the other two were taken over and renamed.

Of the second order, the 12 ships under construction in Britain were taken over by the RN; all were renamed and given Flower names in keeping with the class.

The six ships under construction in France all fell into German hands. Building continued slowly, and by 1944, three had been completed for use by the German Kriegsmarine. These ships underwent a number of changes to reflect changes in role and circumstances. They were rated as patrol gunboats and commissioned as PA 1 to 4.

After the creation of the Free French Naval Forces (FNFL) the RN transferred a number of ships to the FNFL. These included eight Flowers, all transferred and renamed on completion. Some retained a Flower name while others took the names that honoured French naval heroes.

These ships, in French and in British service, saw action throughout the Atlantic campaign and performed sterling work. Two of the French, and one of the British vessels were lost in action, while three of them, two French and one British, were successful in sinking U-boats.

Losses
, mined in North Sea, 22 June 1940 (on trials). The engineer manager of Smith's Dock and several of his staff were lost with the ship.

Successes
La Paimpolaise / , and others sank  27 June 1941.
 sank  on 7 February 1943.

Ships

French Navy (Marine nationale)

Free French Navy (Forces navales françaises libres (FNFL))

Notes

Sources

 
 
Flower-class corvettes
Ship classes of the French Navy